Fields Point (also known as Field's Point) is a historic park in the Washington Park neighborhood of Providence, Rhode Island jutting into Narragansett Bay right near the Providence River and Route 95.

History
The point was named after William Field, a British colonist who settled in Providence, RI with an acreage and a house on what is now South Main Street. In the 19th century, Fields Point Farm, a  park, developed as the major recreational area in the city until Roger Williams Park was created in 1871.  Visitors came to the Point to visit Colonel Atwell's Clam House, Edgewood Beach, The Washington Park Yacht Club and Kerwin's Beach.
            
Following the attack on Pearl Harbor in December 1941, the US Maritime Commission selected Field's Point as a location for a shipyard as part of the Emergency Shipbuilding Program. Much of what had previously been there was sacrificed to wartime necessity. The yard was eventually taken over by the Walsh-Kaiser Company. Throughout the 1950s and 1960s, one of the piers of the former shipyard was used to house a US Naval Reserve center. The Submarine USS Lionfish was berthed at the pier for use as a training vessel from 1960 until circa 1970. She now lies only a few miles away at Battleship Cove in Fall River, Massachusetts. The facility is now a (combined Army, Navy, Marine) Armed Forces Reserve Center.

In the 1950s, Providence started using Fields Point as a landfill, eventually connecting the Point with nearby Starve Goat Island.  In the 1960s, entrepreneur, Melvin Berry started "bar, marina, swim club, amusement park, bowling alley, drive-in theatre, indoor ice skating rink and a nightly Hawaiian dance show" in Fields Point. Circa the mid to late 1960s, Fields Point was also utilized as an operations base for high speed testing between Westerly and Boston of the Gas turbine Turbo Train, before acting as a train graveyard for the three trainsets after September 1976.     In 1973, Johnson & Wales University established a facility in Fields Point, but by 2001, the university leased land to Save The Bay for an educational center. In late 2012 a three-turbine wind farm was installed at Fields Point to provide energy for the waste water treatment plant.

See also
Chemical Building, Fields Point Sewage Treatment Plant
Return Sludge Pumping Station, Fields Point Sewage Treatment Plant

References

Parks in Rhode Island
Geography of Providence, Rhode Island
Protected areas of Providence County, Rhode Island
Tourist attractions in Providence, Rhode Island